Major Lewis Ginter (April 4, 1824 – October 2, 1897) was a prominent businessman, financier, military officer, real estate developer, and philanthropist centered in Richmond, Virginia.  A native of New York City, Ginter accumulated a considerable fortune throughout his numerous business ventures and became one of Richmond's wealthiest citizens despite his exceptionally modest demeanor.  While the Jefferson Hotel and Ginter Park embody some of Ginter's major urban contributions to Richmond, many of his philanthropic gifts were given anonymously to charitable organizations and individuals in need.  Ginter played a major role in bringing Richmond back from the ravages of the Civil War. His continued devotion to the city is captured in his famous remark, "I am for Richmond, first and last."

Early life
Lewis Ginter was born to John and Elizabeth Ginter on April 4, 1824 in New York City. His father owned a grocery store, but died soon after Ginter was born. Several years later, Ginter's mother died, leaving him to be raised by his married sister, Jane Ginter Arents.

Richmond

Early business
In 1842, at the age of eighteen, Ginter relocated to Richmond, Virginia to open up a shop selling notions and toys.  He had visited the city at least once before with an uncle. Ginter soon moved up to the "house furnishings" business. Then, in 1853, he began marketing wholesale notions and imported fancy goods to village and country merchants, and in early 1860 his nephew, George Arents, joined the partnership of Ginter, Alvey & Arents. It was known as "the largest wholesale notion house and handlers of white goods and Irish linen in the South." Ginter traveled throughout the United States and Europe in search of quality merchandise, and amassed a considerable fortune before the beginning of the American Civil War.  Preparing for unpredictable times, Ginter invested in large quantities of tobacco, sugar, and cotton that were stored in Richmond warehouses in order to protect his wealth.

Military office
Although he was originally from the North, Ginter supported his adopted home in the Confederacy by buying Confederate bonds and waiving outstanding debts.  Shortly after the war broke out, he volunteered in the Confederate Quartermaster Department in Richmond, amassing supplies for the troops. He joined the Confederate Army as a commissary with the rank of Major in 1862 and received praise from his superiors for his heroic deeds on and off the battlefield, which earned him the nickname "The Fighting Commissary."  Major Ginter served under Generals Robert E. Lee, Joseph R. Anderson, Stonewall Jackson, A.P. Hill and Edward Lloyd Thomas, and retained this title from affectionate Southerners long after the war ended. As fate would have it, Major Ginter was in the Confederate capital on official business during the Evacuation and capture of Richmond and retreated to Amelia Court House, Virginia, to meet up with the remnants of his brigade. He was present during Lee's surrender at Appomattox Court House, and returned to Richmond several days later.

New York
Upon his return to Richmond, Ginter found the city in a state of ruin. His warehouse stores of tobacco and sugar were destroyed in a fire that consumed much of the business district, though his cotton remained unscathed. With little economic opportunity in Richmond, he sold his cotton and returned to New York City to pursue a career in banking. First joining the firm of Harrison & Company, he experienced great financial success. But his renewed fortune was short-lived. The Black Friday gold panic in 1869 forced Ginter to use his personal fortune to settle heavy debts his firm incurred. Having lost all of his wealth once again, Ginter sold tobacco on consignment in New York for Richmond tobacconist John F. Allen. In 1872, Ginter decided to return to affordable Richmond.

Return to Richmond

Tobacco
In 1872, Ginter joined John F. Allen to form John F. Allen & Company, which manufactured chewing tobacco, pipe tobacco and a small line of cigars. Shortly after, at Ginter's urging, the firm was the first to manufacture cigarettes with mild, 100% domestic bright leaf tobacco, grown in the Virginia and North Carolina piedmont, rather than with strong "Turkish" tobaccos. When the firm released its first cigarettes in 1875, it was the first in the South to manufacture cigarettes as its primary branded product. Early production began in a factory with twenty young, white women, who hand-rolled the cigarettes. Initially, the cigarettes weren't successful in the South, where men overwhelmingly preferred chewing tobacco. Around 1880, the firm was renamed Allen & Ginter. Ginter's "Richmond Gem" cigarettes were first a hit in London where, with help from his agent, John Morgan Richards, they were marketed as a foreign novelty.  Allen & Ginter also manufactured cigarettes with "Turkish" tobacco or blends. Their brands included "Richmond Straight-Cut No. 1," "The Pet," "Dubec," "Opera Puffs," and "Our Little Beauties." In 1881, with growing competition in the tobacco industry, Ginter began leasing James Bonsack's newly-invented cigarette rolling machine.  By 1888, Allen & Ginter employed over 1,000 workers and cigarette production increased from 100,000 per month to 2,000,000 per day. The firm eventually opened offices in London, Paris, and Berlin in order to meet foreign demand for their products. Allen & Ginter continued to prosper until they merged with J. B. Duke, Kinney Brothers Tobacco Company, Goodwin & Company and W.S. Kimball & Company to form the American Tobacco Company in January 1890. Ginter was offered the presidency, but declined and remained a director until his death.

Real estate

Although Ginter had lived in Richmond for several decades, he did not purchase his first home until 1876.  He invited his sister, Jane Arents, and three of her daughters, Grace, Joanna, and Minnie, to live with him at 405 East Cary Street.  In 1891, he completed construction of a freestyle, Richardsonian Romanesque mansion in an elite neighborhood at 901 West Franklin Street. Even today, the structure is known as the Ginter House.

Ginter was inspired by the suburban developments in Melbourne and Sydney that he visited on one of many business trips marketing for Allen & Ginter. Beginning in 1888, Ginter and John Pope began assembling large tracts of land just north of Richmond in Henrico County, with the intention of developing an upscale streetcar suburb. Their purchases included part of the original Westbrook Plantation, which they developed into their own country estate. Ginter's renovated and enlarged Westbrook house included a private barbershop. An outbuilding featured an automated, one-lane bowling alley." Ginter and Pope divided the large swaths of land into residential plots and provided many extravagant amenities, such as fresh artesian wells, tile sewer lines, roads covered with crushed stone, and the extension of the Richmond Union Passenger Railway, the nation's first large-scale electric streetcar system. The neighborhood, known as Ginter Park, attracted the Union Theological Seminary and was eventually annexed to the City of Richmond. Ginter also laid the groundwork for several adjoining neighborhoods, including Bellevue Park and Sherwood Park. He established the Lakeside Wheel Club in 1895, and Lakeside Park in 1896.

Always eager to improve Richmond, Ginter hired famed architects Carrère and Hastings in 1892 to design a world-class hotel known as the Jefferson.  An estimated 5 to 10 million dollars was invested in the realization of the hotel before it opened on October 31, 1895. It was immediately praised as one of the finest hotels in the country.  Ginter commissioned Edward V. Valentine to create a life-size sculpture of Thomas Jefferson from Carrara marble to be displayed as the centerpiece of the upper lobby.  Additional novelties included exotic palm trees from Central and South America, numerous antiques, Turkish and Russian baths, electric elevators, and for a brief period, alligators in the lobby fountain. Not only did the Jefferson become an icon of Ginter's immeasurable dedication to his adopted city, it symbolized Richmond's growing post-war prosperity.

John Pope 
While working in New York City after the war, Ginter met John Pope, a messenger boy who delivered packages to his firm.  Pope was born in New York City in 1856 to a German immigrant family.  His father was a shoemaker, and Pope acquired the delivery job at the age of 14 to help his family make ends meet.  Ginter eventually hired Pope to work in the New York tobacco depot. When Ginter relocated back to Richmond, he brought Pope along with him as his apprentice.

The two began an enduring business partnership that would last for the remainder of their lives.  Pope grew to become Ginter's trusted business partner and assumed a number of executive roles, including Vice President of Allen & Ginter in 1888, and President of the Crystal Ice Company, James River Marl and Bone Phosphate Company, and Powhatan Clay Manufacturing Company.  When the American Tobacco Company was formed in 1890, Pope served as vice-president and managed the centralized cigarette operations in Richmond. Like Ginter, Pope was involved in a number of philanthropic activities, and strove to avoid the public eye.

Ginter and Pope remained lifelong bachelors, both living in Ginter's home, until Pope's premature death in 1896. Pope was buried in a plot in Hollywood Cemetery that Ginter had reserved for himself. While the intimate details of their relationship are unknown, Pope's obituary said he "lived quietly with Major Ginter, for whom he possessed the most ardent affection." And Ginter's obituary said he "never pointedly sought" the company of women.

Death

The death of Ginter's close companion John Pope left him noticeably distraught. Ginter also suffered from diabetes, and his health quickly declined before being bedridden at his Westbrook estate. After two months of severe debilitation, Ginter died on October 2, 1897. His funeral was regarded as one of the largest in Richmond's history, and about a year later his remains were placed in a private mausoleum in Hollywood Cemetery, overlooking the James River.

Legacy
At the time of his death, Ginter had amassed one of the largest personal fortunes in the South. His enduring commitment to Richmond is evidenced in his significant investments in real estate, business, and most notably, his philanthropic activity. Even while Ginter was traveling abroad, he reportedly ordered items from Richmond to support local merchants. His will included gifts to almost every charity and public institution in the city.  The remainder of his wealth was left to his relatives, including his niece, Grace Arents, who continued in her uncle's charitable footsteps. Arents converted the Lakeside Wheel Club into a progressive farm known as Bloemendaal, which she later arranged to become Lewis Ginter Botanical Garden. She also developed St. Andrew's Episcopal Church and St. Andrew's School, built playgrounds, and funded numerous schools and medical institutions. In 1897, the Richmond Dispatch praised Ginter as "one whose public spirit and broad charity have made his name familiar and honored throughout this city, which he loved so well, did so much to build up and beautify."

Notes

References
Burns, Brian. Lewis Ginter: Richmond's Gilded Age Icon. Charleston, SC: History Press, 2011.  
Enstad, Nan. Cigarettes, Inc.: An Intimate History of Corporate Imperialism. Chicago, IL: University of Chicago Press, 2018.   
"History." Ginter Park Residents Association Newsletter. April 7, 2014. http://www.ginterpark.org/ginter-park-history.php. Retrieved February 13, 2021.
"History."  "The Jefferson". April 7, 2014. http://www.jeffersonhotel.com/experience/history. Retrieved February 13, 2021.
The Industries of Richmond: Her Trade, Commerce, Manufactures. Richmond: Metropolitan Publishing Company, 1886. https://archive.org/stream/industriesofrich00wood#page/n1/mode/2up. Retrieved February 13, 2021.
"John Pope." The Virginia Magazine of History and Biography 4, no. 3 (1897): 320-321.
"Lewis Ginter." The Virginia Magazine of History and Biography 5, no. 3 (1898): 348-349.
Marschak, Beth, and Alex Lorch. Lesbian and Gay Richmond. Charleston, SC: Arcadia Pub., 2008.
Richmond Dispatch.  Oct. 3, 1897.
Richmond Daily Whig, March 21, 1860.
Ryan, David D., and Wayland W. Rennie.  Lewis Ginter's Richmond: Bellevue, Bloemendaal, Ginter Park, "Laburnum," Laburnum Park, Sherwood Park, the Jefferson Hotel, "Westbrook," Post Civil War to Present. S.I.: s.n., 1991.

1824 births
1897 deaths
American people of Dutch descent
Philanthropists from New York (state)
American tobacco industry executives
Burials at Hollywood Cemetery (Richmond, Virginia)
Businesspeople from New York City
Confederate States Army officers
Businesspeople from Richmond, Virginia
Military personnel from Richmond, Virginia
People of Virginia in the American Civil War
19th-century American philanthropists
19th-century American businesspeople
Philanthropists from Virginia
Military personnel from New York City
Northern-born Confederates